The 1994 Saxony state election was held on 11 September 1994 to elect the members of the 2nd Landtag of Saxony. The incumbent Christian Democratic Union (CDU) government led by Minister-President Kurt Biedenkopf retained its majority and continued in office.

Parties
The table below lists parties represented in the 1st Landtag of Saxony.

Election result

|-
! colspan="2" | Party
! Votes
! %
! +/-
! Seats 
! +/-
! Seats %
|-
| bgcolor=| 
| align=left | Christian Democratic Union (CDU)
| align=right| 1,199,883
| align=right| 58.1
| align=right| 4.3
| align=right| 77
| align=right| 15
| align=right| 64.2
|-
| bgcolor=| 
| align=left | Social Democratic Party (SPD)
| align=right| 341,706
| align=right| 16.6
| align=right| 3.5
| align=right| 22
| align=right| 10
| align=right| 18.3
|-
| bgcolor=| 
| align=left | Party of Democratic Socialism (PDS)
| align=right| 339,619
| align=right| 16.5
| align=right| 6.3
| align=right| 21
| align=right| 4
| align=right| 17.5
|-
! colspan=8|
|-
| bgcolor=| 
| align=left | Alliance 90/The Greens (Grüne)
| align=right| 85,485
| align=right| 4.1
| align=right| 1.5
| align=right| 0
| align=right| 10
| align=right| 0
|-
| bgcolor=| 
| align=left | Free Democratic Party (FDP)
| align=right| 36,075
| align=right| 1.7
| align=right| 3.6
| align=right| 0
| align=right| 9
| align=right| 0
|-
| bgcolor=| 
| align=left | The Republicans (REP)
| align=right| 26,177
| align=right| 1.3
| align=right| 1.3
| align=right| 0
| align=right| ±0
| align=right| 0
|-
| bgcolor=|
| align=left | Others
| align=right| 33,837
| align=right| 1.6
| align=right| 
| align=right| 0
| align=right| ±0
| align=right| 0
|-
! align=right colspan=2| Total
! align=right| 2,063,782
! align=right| 100.0
! align=right| 
! align=right| 120
! align=right| 40
! align=right| 
|-
! align=right colspan=2| Voter turnout
! align=right| 
! align=right| 58.4
! align=right| 14.4
! align=right| 
! align=right| 
! align=right| 
|}

Sources
 Statisches Landesamt Sachsen

Elections, 1994
1994 elections in Germany
September 1994 events in Europe